The 1993 LSU Tigers football team represented Louisiana State University in the college football season of 1993.  The Tigers played their home games at Tiger Stadium in Baton Rouge, Louisiana.

LSU suffered its worst loss in program history, 58–3 to Florida at home October 9. Following a loss at Kentucky, the Tigers went on a three-game winning streak, including a 17-13 shocker over defending national champion Alabama at Tuscaloosa, ending the Crimson Tide's 31-game unbeaten streak (the NCAA later shortened the streak to 23 when it forced Alabama to forfeit all of its 1993 victories (and a tie vs. Tennessee) due to violations involving All-America defensive back Antonio Langham).

With a bowl berth on the line in the season finale, Arkansas came to Baton Rouge and gouged the Tigers for 412 yards rushing in a 42–24 triumph, leaving LSU with its fifth consecutive losing campaign.

Schedule

Roster

References

LSU
LSU Tigers football seasons
LSU Tigers football